Villers-sur-Semois Castle is a castle in Villers-sur-Semois in the municipality of Étalle in the province of Luxembourg, Wallonia, Belgium.

See also
List of castles in Belgium

Castles in Belgium
Castles in Luxembourg (Belgium)
Étalle, Belgium